Miñoso is a surname. Notable people with the surname include:

Minnie Miñoso (1925–2015), Cuban baseball player
Silvio Pedro Miñoso (born 1976), Cuban footballer